Casi Alba is the seventh album from Puerto Rican folk singer Roy Brown, and his second with the group Aires Bucaneros. The album was released under Brown's label Discos Lara-Yarí in 1980.

Background and recording

Casi Alba was recorded from July to September 1980 at Latin Sound Studios in New York City. The album features writing contributions from Brown and the other members of Aires Bucaneros, notably Zoraida Santiago. The title song is based on a poem by Julia de Burgos. It also features a second version of Oubao Moin, in which Santiago shares the lead vocals with Brown.

Re-release

Aires Bucaneros and Casi Alba were re-released in 1993 as a double CD.

Track listing

Personnel

Musicians 
 Zoraida Santiago - vocals
 Carl Royce - cuatro
 Pablo Nieves - percussion
 Roberto Reverón - drums
 Harry Rodríguez - bass
 Jon Royce
 Carlos Santiago - piano on Track 6

Recording and production 
 Kevin Zambrana - recording

Notes 

1980 albums
Roy Brown (Puerto Rican musician) albums